Karoline Offigstad Knotten (born 6 January 1995) is a Norwegian biathlete. She has competed in the Biathlon World Cup since 2018, and represented Norway at the Biathlon World Championships 2020 and the 2022 Winter Olympics.

Career

World Cup

Individual podiums
 2 podiums

References

External links
 
 
 
 
 

1995 births
Living people
21st-century Norwegian women
Norwegian female biathletes
Sportspeople from Tromsø
Biathletes at the 2022 Winter Olympics
Olympic biathletes of Norway